Over the years, the British hard rock band Uriah Heep has released 25 studio albums (of original material), 20 live albums, 41 compilation albums, 27 UK singles (33 worldwide) and 17 videos. The band's best selling album is Sweet Freedom, which was released in 1973 and its worldwide sales are more than 6 million copies. Uriah Heep's progressive/art rock/heavy metal fusion's distinctive features have always featured massive keyboards sound, strong vocal harmonies and (in the early years) David Byron's operatic vocals. Twelve of the band's albums have made it to the UK Albums Chart (Return to Fantasy reached No. 7 in 1975) while of the fifteen Billboard 200 Uriah Heep albums Demons and Wizards was the most successful (No. 23, 1972). In the late 1970s the band had massive success in Germany, where the "Lady in Black" single was a big hit. With Black Sabbath, Deep Purple and Led Zeppelin, Uriah Heep became one of the top heavy metal and hard rock bands of the 1970s.

Studio albums

Live albums

Compilation albums

{|class="wikitable" style="text-align:center;"
|-
!rowspan="2"| Year
!rowspan="2" style="width:210px;"| Album details
!colspan="6"| Peak chart positions
!rowspan="2"| Certifications(sales thresholds)
|-
!style="width:3em;font-size:85%"| AUT

!style="width:3em;font-size:85%"| FIN

!style="width:3em;font-size:85%"| GER

!style="width:3em;font-size:85%"| NOR

!style="width:3em;font-size:85%"| SWE

!style="width:3em;font-size:85%"| US
|-
|1976
|align="left"| The Best of Uriah Heep
Released: February 1976
Label: Bronze, Mercury (SRM-1-1070)
| 8
| —
| —
| —
| 47
| 145
|align="left"|
BVMI: Gold
|-
|1985
|align="left"| Anthology
Released: 1985
Label: Parlophone / Elektra
| —
| —
| —
| —
| —
| —
|align="left"|
|-
|1986
|align="left"| Anthology Volume One
Released: April 1986
Label: Legacy
| —
| —
| —
| —
| —
| —
|align="left"|
|-
|1988
|align="left"| Collection
Released: 1988
Label: Legacy
| —
| —
| —
| —
| —
| —
|align="left"|
|-
|rowspan="3"|1989
|align="left"| The Collection
Released: 1989
Label: Castle
| —
| —
| —
| —
| —
| —
|align="left"|
|-
|align="left"| Ironstrike: 14 Rock Hard Hits
Released: 1989
Label: Avanti
| —
| —
| —
| —
| —
| —
|align="left"|
|-
|align="left"| Milestones
Released: 1989
Label: Castle
| —
| —
| —
| —
| —
| —
|align="left"|
|-
|rowspan="2"|1990
|align="left"| Still 'eavy Still Proud
Released: April 1990
Label: Legacy
| —
| —
| —
| —
| —
| —
|align="left"|
|-
|align="left"| Two Decades in Rock
Released: June 1990
Label: Essential
| —
| —
| —
| —
| —
| —
|align="left"|
|-
|rowspan="2"|1991
|align="left"| Echoes in the Dark
Released: 1991
Label: Elite
| —
| —
| —
| —
| —
| —
|align="left"|
|-
|align="left"| Rarities from the Bronze Age
Released: 1991
Label: Sequel
| —
| —
| —
| —
| —
| —
|align="left"|
|-
|1993
|align="left"| The Lansdowne Tapes
Released: July 1993
Label: Parlophone, Elektra 
| —
| —
| —
| —
| —
| —
|align="left"|
|-
|1994
|align="left"| Lady in Black
Released: 21 November 1994
Label: Parlophone, Elektra
| —
| —
| —
| —
| —
| —
|align="left"|
|-
|rowspan="2"|1996
|align="left"| A Time of Revelation (4-CD box set) 
Released: May 1996
Label: Essential
| —
| —
| —
| —
| —
| —
|align="left"|
|-
|align="left"| The Best of ... Part 1
Released: 1996
Label: Essential
| —
| —
| —
| —
| —
| —
|align="left"|
|-
|1997
|align="left"| The Best of ... Part 2
Released: April 1997
Label: Essential
| —
| —
| —
| —
| —
| —
|align="left"|
|-
|1998
|align="left"| Classic: An Anthology
Released: 15 September 1998
Label: Parlophone, Elektra
| —
| —
| —
| —
| —
| —
|align="left"|
|-
|rowspan="2"|2000
|align="left"| ''Easy LivinReleased: 2000
Label: Delta
| —
| —
| —
| —
| —
| —
|align="left"|
|-
|align="left"| Travellers in Time
Released: February 2000
Label: Essential
| —
| —
| —
| —
| —
| —
|align="left"|
|-
|rowspan="5"|2001
|align="left"| Blood on Stone
Released: March 2001
Label: Castle
| —
| —
| —
| —
| —
| —
|align="left"|
|-
|align="left"| Empty the Vaults: The Rarities
Released: June 2001
Label: Castle
| —
| —
| —
| —
| —
| —
|align="left"|
|-
|align="left"| Come Away Melinda: The Ballads
Released: June 2001
Label: Castle
| —
| —
| —
| —
| —
| —
|align="left"|
|-
|align="left"| Remasters: The Official Anthology
Released: 28 October 2001,Remasters features new re-mixes, alternate versions en re-recordings of classic Heep material from 1970 to 2001, recorded by the band line-up of 2001
Label: Parlphone, Elektra 
| —
| —
| —
| —
| —
| —
|align="left"|
|-
|align="left"| 20th Century Masters: The Millennium Collection: The Best of Uriah Heep
Released: 10 November 2001
Label: Parlophone, Elektra
| —
| —
| —
| —
| —
| —
|align="left"|
|-
|rowspan="2"|2002
|align="left"| The Very Best of Uriah Heep
Released: May 2002
Label: Sanctuary
| —
| —
| —
| —
| —
| —
|align="left"|
|-
|align="left"| Between Two Worlds
Released: 30 June 2002
Label: Parlophone, Elektra
| —
| —
| —
| —
| —
| —
|align="left"|
|-
|rowspan="2"|2003
|align="left"| The Very Best of Uriah Heep
Released: March 2003
Label: BMG Camden
| —
| —
| —
| —
| —
| —
|align="left"|
|-
|align="left"| The Ultimate Collection
Released: July 2003
Label: Parlophone, Elektra
| —
| 11
| —
| 14
| —
| —
|align="left"|
|-
|rowspan="2"|2004
|align="left"| Revelations
Released: February 2004
Label: Union Square Music
| —
| —
| —
| —
| —
| —
|align="left"|
|-
|align="left"| Rainbow Demon: Live & in the Studio 1994–1998
Released: April 2004
Label: Parlophone, Elektra
| —
| —
| —
| —
| —
| —
|align="left"|
|-
|2005
|align="left"| Chapter & Verse
Released: 27 February 2005
Label: Capitol
| —
| —
| —
| —
| —
| —
|align="left"|
|-
|rowspan="2"|2006
|align="left"| The Very Best of Uriah Heep
Released: February 2006
Label: Capitol
| —
| —
| —
| —
| —
| —
|align="left"|
|-
|align="left"| Easy Livin': Singles A's & B's
Released: 22 May 2006
Label: Capitol
| —
| —
| —
| —
| —
| —
|align="left"|
|-
|2007
|align="left"| Loud Proud & Heavy: The Best of Uriah Heep
Released: 5 February 2007
Label: Parlophone, Hollywood
| —
| —
| —
| —
| —
| —
|align="left"|
|-
|2009
|align="left"| Celebration – Forty Years of Rock
Released: 6 November 2009
Label: Edel
| —
| —
| 99
| —
| —
| —
|
|-
|2009
|align="left"| The Definite Spitfire Collection
Released: November 2009
Label: Store for Music
| —
| —
| —
| —
| —
| —
|align="left"|
|-
|rowspan="2"|2010
|align="left"| On the Rebound; A Very 'eavy 40th Anniversary Collection
Released: May 2010
Label: Sanctuary
| —
| —
| —
| —
| —
| —
|align="left"|
|-
|align="left"| The Uriah Heep Collection
Released: October 2010
Label: Brunswick
| —
| —
| —
| —
| —
| —
|align="left"|
|-
|2011
|align="left"| Wizards: The Best Of
Released: August 2011
Label: Parlophone, Atlantic, Sanctuary
| —
| —
| —
| —
| —
| —
|align="left"|
|-
|2012
|align="left"| Logical Revelations
Released: January 2012
Label: Store for Music
| —
| —
| —
| —
| —
| —
|align="left"|
|-
|2015
|align="left"| Totally Driven
Released: 12 November 2015
Label: Uriah Heep
| —
| —
| —
| —
| —
| —
|align="left"|
|}

SinglesNotes'''

Video albums

References

External links
Chart positions of Uriah Heep in the UK
 
 

Discography
Rock music group discographies
Discographies of British artists